Taurochenodeoxycholate 6alpha-hydroxylase (CYP3A4, CYP4A21, taurochenodeoxycholate 6alpha-monooxygenase) is an enzyme with systematic name taurochenodeoxycholate,NADPH:oxygen oxidoreductase (6alpha-hydroxylating). This enzyme catalyses the following chemical reaction

 (1) taurochenodeoxycholate + NADPH + H+ + O2  taurohyocholate + NADP+ + H2O
 (2) lithocholate + NADPH + H+ + O2  hyodeoxycholate + NADP+ + H2O

Taurochenodeoxycholate 6α-hydroxylase is a heme-thiolate protein (P-450).

See also 
 CYP3A4

References

External links 
 

EC 1.14.13